A chenier is a former beach that, through the activities of nature, have become isolated from the sea by strips of marshes. Chenier may also mean:

André Chénier (1762–1794), French poet
C. J. Chenier (born 1957), American musician
Clifton Chenier (1925–1987), American musician
Felix Chenier (1843–1910), Canadian lawyer and political figure
George Chenier (1907–1970), Canadian snooker player
Jean-Olivier Chénier (1806–1837), Lower Canada soldier
Joseph Chénier (1764-1811), French writer and brother of André
Phil Chenier (born 1950), American basketball player
Pierre Chenier, Canadian politician
Ray Chénier (born 1935), Canadian politician
René Chénier, Canadian film producer

See also
Cheniers, a commune in the Marne department in north-eastern France
Chéniers, a commune in the Creuse department in central France
Andrea Chénier, an opera by Umberto Giordano
Chenier Cell, a terrorist cell of the Front de libération du Québec